Oryctopus is a genus of insect in the subfamily Stenopelmatinae and the sole genus in the tribe Oryctopini. Species have been recorded from India and Sri Lanka.

Species
The Orthoptera Species File lists:
 Oryctopus bolivari Brunner von Wattenwyl, 1888 - type species
 Oryctopus bouvieri Karny, 1935
 Oryctopus prodigiosus Bolívar, 1900
 Oryctopus sordellii (Griffini, 1914)

References 

Ensifera genera
Stenopelmatoidea